Ab Bid Sari-ye Do (also Romanized as Āb Bīd Sarī-ye Do; also known as Abidsareh-ye Do) is a village in Shahi Rural District, Sardasht District, Dezful County, Khuzestan Province, Iran. At the 2006 census, its population was 182, in 34 families.

References 

Populated places in Dezful County